Karlos is a Basque masculine given name. Notable people referred to by this name include the following

Given name

Karlos Arguiñano (born 1948), Spanish (Basque) chef
Karlos Balderas, nickname of Carlos Balderas (born 1996), American boxer
Karlos Dansby (born 1981), American gridiron football player
Karlos Ferrer (born 1998), Puerto Rican football player
Karlos Filiga full name of Karl Filiga (born 1988), New Zealand rugby player
Karlos Kirby (born 1967), American bobsledder
Karlos Linazasoro (born 1962), Spanish writer
Karlos Moser, American music professor
Karlos Rosé stage name of Carlos de la Rosa, Dominican bachata music performer
Karlos Santisteban (born 1960), Spanish (Basque) writer
Karlos Vémola (born 1985), Czech mixed martial artist
Karlos Williams (born 1993), American gridiron football player

Middle name
Juan Karlos Labajo (born 2001), Filipino musician
Wesley Karlos Piedade (born 1989), Brazilian football player

See also

Carlos (given name)
Kardos (surname)
Karlo (name)
Karlous
Karlov (surname)
Karlow (name)
Karolos

Notes

Basque masculine given names
Surnames from given names